Seamus Noonan is an Irish lawyer who currently serves as a Judge of the Court of Appeal. He practised as a barrister prior to serving as a Judge of the High Court between 2014 and 2019.

Early career 
Noonan is from County Meath. He was educated at Trinity College Dublin, where he received an LLB in 1976. He was called to the bar in July 1977 and became a senior counsel in 2007.

His practice as a barrister primarily consisted of medical negligence and personal injuries law.

While in practice, he was also a decision-maker. He was an accredited mediator, member of the Living Donor Ethics Committee at Beaumont Hospital, Dublin and arbitrator in disputes involving the Society of the Irish Motor Industry.

Judicial career

High Court 
Noonan was appointed to the High Court in September 2014.

He was the Judge-in-Charge of the Judicial Review and Non-Jury Lists. He heard cases in this area involving school expulsions, matters arising out of the Disclosures Tribunal, and planning law appeals. He refused an application taken by Independent News & Media in 2018 seeking to prevent the Office of the Director of Corporate Enforcement from appointing inspectors to investigate the company.

While at the High Court, Noonan also heard cases involving defamation, insolvency, and defamation.

Court of Appeal 
Following the enactment of legislation to increase the number of judges of the Court of Appeal in 2019, Noonan was appointed a Judge of the Court of Appeal in November 2019.

Since November 2019, Noonan has been a member of the Judicial Council's Personal Injuries Guidelines Committee to advise on recommended awards for personal injuries.

References 

Living people
Alumni of Trinity College Dublin
High Court judges (Ireland)
Judges of the Court of Appeal (Ireland)
21st-century Irish judges
Alumni of King's Inns
Year of birth missing (living people)